Charles Michael "Chuck" Newman  (born 1 March 1946) is a mathematician and a physicist at the Courant Institute of Mathematical Sciences of New York University. He works in the fields of mathematical physics, statistical mechanics, and probability theory.

He has contributed to numerous fields where probability mixes with physics, including metastability, spin glasses, the mathematics of food webs and the Ising model, and percolation theory including its connections to Schramm–Loewner evolutions and the Brownian web.

He is a member of the National Academy of Sciences since 2004, and of the American Academy of Arts and Sciences since 2006. According to his citation for membership of the National Academy of Sciences, he is "an agile and creative probabilist" who "has made deep, unusually insightful contributions over a wide range of science. He is most widely known for his work in disordered systems, including percolation models, random networks and spin glasses. His contributions combine conceptual penetration with technical virtuosity."

In 2012 he became a fellow of the American Mathematical Society.

Newman graduated from MIT in 1966 with degrees in both mathematics and physics. He completed his PhD at Princeton University in 1971 with advisor Arthur Wightman. After two years as an assistant professor at NYU, he accepted a position at Indiana University. In 1979 he moved to the University of Arizona in Tucson, and then in 1989 to the Courant Institute. He was chair of the Mathematics Department from 1998–2001, and Director of the Institute from 2002–2006. His students at NYU have included Seema Nanda. He is married with two daughters.

Selected books

 (pbk reprint of 1990 original)

References

Members of the United States National Academy of Sciences
Fellows of the American Academy of Arts and Sciences
Fellows of the American Mathematical Society
Massachusetts Institute of Technology School of Science alumni
Princeton University alumni
Living people
20th-century  American mathematicians
Courant Institute of Mathematical Sciences faculty
University of Arizona faculty
Indiana University faculty
1946 births
21st-century  American mathematicians